is located in Yamabuki-cho, Shinjuku, Tokyo, Japan. Shinjuku Yamabuki has Japan's most famous no class credit system and Information Technology course of high school. Shinjuku Yamabuki is operated by the Tokyo Metropolitan Government Board of Education.

Many of the students leave school before graduation. This school prioritizes diversity and is famous for its advanced technology.

School tradition
Uniforms are worn at the school.

The school is open from AM 8:45 to PM 2:15. Students create their own schedule, ensuring that they earn the required 74 credits in order to graduate, and they pay tuition for each class they take. In the class of 2003, students had to pay 1440 JPY per class.

High-schools of Finland are similar in the sense that student's curriculum vary based on the choice of the individual.

Course
Part-time standard
Part-time Information Technology
correspondence standard

Notable alumni
Emi Hashino
Harumi Inoue
Kana Mannami
Sonim
Rio Shimamoto

See also

References

External links
 Shinjuku Yamabuki High School Official website (Japanese)

Tokyo Metropolitan Government Board of Education schools
Educational institutions established in 1991
1991 establishments in Japan